MAF Uganda, whose complete name is Mission Aviation Fellowship Uganda, is a privately owned airline in Uganda, licensed by the Uganda Civil Aviation Authority with an air operator's certificate. The company is a  Christian organization that provides aviation, communications, and learning technology services to Christian and humanitarian agencies, as well as isolated missionaries and indigenous villagers in the region of the African Great Lakes.

Location
The headquarters of MAF Uganda are located at Gate 2, Kajjansi Airfield, in the town of Kajjansi, in Wakiso District, in the Central Region of Uganda. The geographical coordinates of the airline's headquarters are: 0°11'45.0"N, 32°33'09.0"E (Latitude:0.195833; Longitude:32.552500).

Overview
MAF Uganda, is a subsidiary and member of the international Christian charity, Mission Aviation Fellowship, based in Nampa, Idaho, United States, present in over 30 countries around the world and with more than 130 aircraft in service. In Uganda, MAF operates five aircraft from its base and office at Kajjansi Airfield, to destinations in the Northern Region of Uganda, the eastern parts of the Democratic Republic of the Congo and South Sudan.

Destinations
From its hub in Kajjansi, the company operates passenger charter services to destinations within Eastern Africa. Following is a partial list of destinations that MAF Uganda serves, as of May 2019.

Fleet
As of May 2019, MAF Uganda maintained the following aircraft in service.

See also

 Airlines of Africa 
 List of airlines of Uganda

References

External links
 Website of MAF Uganda

Airlines of Uganda
Airlines established in 1987
Wakiso District
1987 establishments in Uganda
Organisations based in Kajjansi